Farhan or Farhaan (Arabic: فرحان farḥān) is a name of Arabic origin meaning "happy, joyful, blessed, happy, delightful, rejoicing, merry, inclined to hopefulness". The name is the male variant from the female stem given name Farah, and is widely used in West Asia, North Africa and SouthEast Asia.

Notable people with these names include:

Farhan
Farhan Akhtar (born 1974), Indian film director, screenwriter, producer, actor, playback singer and television host
Farhan Farhan (born 1996), Bahraini swimmer
Farhan Khan (actor) (born 1983), Indian actor
Farhan Lalji, Canadian sports reporter 
Farhan Nizami, South Asian historian
Farhan Saeed (born 1984), Pakistani singer-songwriter and actor 
Farhan Saleh (born 1947), Lebanese writer and militant 
Farhan Zaidi (born 1976), Canadian-American baseball executive of Pakistani descent

Farhaan 
 Farhaan Behardien (born 1983), South African cricketer
 Farhaan Faasil, stage name of Ismail Fazil (born 1990), Indian actor in Malayalam cinema
 Farhaan Sayanvala (born 1997), South African cricketer